Mayorovsky is a rural locality (a khutor) in Manoylinskoye Rural Settlement, Kletsky District, Volgograd Oblast, Russia. The population was 82 as of 2010.

Geography 
Mayorovsky is located on the Krepkaya River, 46 km northeast of Kletskaya (the district's administrative centre) by road. Manoylin is the nearest rural locality.

References 

Rural localities in Kletsky District